Dvora Hacohen (born 1936) is an Israeli historian and professor in the Martin (Szusz) Department of Land of Israel Studies and Archaeology at the Bar-Ilan University in Israel. Her research interests are the development of Israeli society.

Biography
Hacohen is a professor of modern history at Bar-Ilan University in Israel. Her central research interest has been transformations in social and cultural history, about which relatively little has been written, compared to the emphasis placed on the political aspects of history. She has written about leaders and their role in the process of social transformations. 
Her research encompasses the history of the Jewish people and of Palestine in the twentieth century, focusing on the history of Zionism; historical biography, Jewish immigration in the twentieth century, history of the Yishuv (Jewish community in Mandatory Palestine) and the state of Israel;

Studies and academic activities
B.Ed. Hacohen studied at Efrata College of Education, Jerusalem. 
B.A.   History and literature at the Hebrew University of Jerusalem. 
M.A.  Jewish History, Magna cum laude, Tel Aviv University.  
Ph.D. Sociology and anthropology, Bar Ilan University, Ramat-Gan ("The great immigration and absorption in Israel in 1948-1953").

Known for her studies on immigration and acculturation, she was called upon by the Minister of Education in Israel to be the academic adviser of the Ministry regarding absorption of the children of immigrants in the great wave of immigration of the 1990s, when nearly one million people immigrated to Israel from the former Soviet Union.Immigration has been one of the most influential elements in the building of the Jewish community in pre-state Palestine, and a major factor in the social and economic development of the State of Israel.

From 1975 to 1992, she was the Scientific Advisor of Educational Television for History and Jewish Studies. From 1986 to 1989, she served as a research fellow at the Ben-Gurion Institute for the Study of Zionism and the State of Israel in Sde Boker, and lecturer in the Department of Jewish History at Ben-Gurion University of the Negev. She also worked as a researcher at Oxford University, Harvard University, and at Hebrew Union College in Cincinnati, and taught as a visiting professor at Rutgers University (2012) in New Jersey, United States.

Prizes and awards
 January 20, 2021: Jewish Book Council winners of the 2021 National Jewish Book Awards - Book of the year award for the book To Repair a Broken World: The Life of Henrietta Szold, Founder of Hadassah by Dvora Hacohen (Harvard University Press).
 January 20, 2021: Jewish Book Council winners of the 2021 National Jewish Book Awards - the Biography Award in Memory of Sara Berenson Stone, for the book To Repair a Broken World: The Life of Henrietta Szold, Founder of Hadassah by Dvora Hacohen (Harvard University Press) "Through diaries, archival documents, and letters, historian Dvora Hacohen presents a fascinating biography of Henriet¬ta Szold — writer, editor, educator, and founder of Hadassah. Hacohen portrays the relentless passion of Szold, who devoted her life to creating opportunities both for Jewish women and the disadvantaged, as she sought to not only empower women, but also to foster a spirit of social cohesion and equality."
 2012. Ben-Zvi Prize for the book Children of the Time, Youth Aliyah 1933-1945, Jerusalem 2011 (in Hebrew), for her excellent research in modern Jewish history. It tells the story of the rescue of over 30,000 children, most of them orphans, from Hitler's clutches.
 2013. David Ben-Gurion Prize, for her outstanding research on Israel, and contribution to scholarship.
 2019. The Zalman Shazar Center for research of Jewish history, award for the book a leader without Bounds. A Biography of Henrietta Szold (Am Oved, Tel Aviv 2019).
 2015. For her social and cultural involvement in various spheres, Hacohen received the award Yakir Yerusahlayim (Honorary Citizenship of Jerusalem).

Select publications
Most widely held works by Dvora Hacohen:
 2021. To Repair a Broken World. The Life of Henrietta Szold, Founder of Hadassah. Harvard University Press. USA 
 2019. A Leader without Bounds. Henrietta Szold, a Biography. (Hebrew, Manhiga Le' lo Gevulot). Am Oved, Tel- Aviv. Israel.
 2011. The  Children of the Time: Youth Aliyah, 1933-1948. (Hebrew, Yaldei Hazman). Yad Vashem, The International Institute for Holocaust Research. Jerusalem the Ben-Gurion Research Institute, Ben Gurion University. Yad Itzhak Ben Zvi, Jerusalem
 2003. Immigrants in Turmoil: Mass  Immigration to Israel and its Repercussions in the 1950s and After. Syracuse University Press. USA. 
 1998. The Grain and the Millstone - The Settlement of Immigrants in The Negev in the First  Decade of the State. (Hebrew, Hagaryin Ve’Harechaim,) Am-Oved, Tel - Aviv, Israel.
 1994. “Direct Absorption” - Socio -Cultural Absorption of Immigrants from Former Soviet Union, 1990 - 1993, (Hebrew. Shitat HaKlitah HaYeshirah Vehshlachoteha,).  The Jerusalem Institute for Israel Studies, Jerusalem, Israel. 
 1994. From Fantasy to Reality, Ben-Gurion’s Plan for Mass Immigration, 1942 - 1945. (Hebrew, Tochnit Ha’Milion,) Tel - Aviv, Israel. 
 1994. Immigrants in Turmoil, The Great Wave of Immigration to Israel and its Absorption, 1948 - 1953. (Hebrew, Olim Be’Seharah,), Yad Izhak Ben -Zvi, Jrusalem,   Israel.  
 1994.ha-Garʻin ṿeha-reḥayim : hityashvut ha-ʻolim ba-Negev ba-ʻaśor ha-rishon la-medinah'' 
 1980. One People, The Story of the Eastern Jews. (co-author). Funk and Wagnalls,  New York.

References

1936 births
Living people
Historians of the Middle East
Israeli historians
Israeli women historians
Jewish historians
Israeli women academics
20th-century Israeli non-fiction writers
21st-century Israeli non-fiction writers
20th-century Israeli women writers
21st-century Israeli women writers
Academic staff of Bar-Ilan University